George Edward "Smitty" Smith (born 1938) is a U.S. Army veteran of the Vietnam War, former prisoner of war, and author.

Captured with other members of his sA- Team, November 24, 1963, he was released two years later in Cambodia.
He later wrote about his experiences in a book titled P.O.W.:Two Years with the Vietcong, published by Ramparts Press in 1971. It is a first person account of United States Army Special Forces Sergeant George Smith's two years as a prisoner of war.  He traveled and lived with the Vietcong as their prisoner in a series of jungle camps, and developed a detailed understanding of life in the National Liberation Front's safe areas and the people he called VC.

Smith was a part of the Indochina Peace Campaign, with Tom Hayden, Jane Fonda, and hundreds of thousands of others.

References

20th-century births
Living people
United States Army soldiers
Vietnam War prisoners of war
United States Army personnel of the Vietnam War
American male writers
Year of birth missing (living people)